David Brian Dougherty (29 March 1967 – 20 April 2017) was a New Zealander who was wrongfully convicted in 1993 on charges of abduction and the rape of an 11-year-old girl. In 1997, when new DNA evidence ruled him out of the charge, Dougherty was acquitted after serving over three years in prison. He received a public apology in 2001 along with $868,728 in compensation. In 2003, the real offender, Nicholas Reekie, was found guilty and convicted of the crime.  Dougherty's case was the subject of the 2008 New Zealand telemovie Until Proven Innocent which documents the miscarriage of justice that had Dougherty imprisoned.

In November 2010, Dougherty pleaded guilty to a burglary charge. He admitted going to a Palmerston North property in October that year to collect money he was owed. He smashed open a ranch slider door and stole beer and DVDs before being caught by the home owner. He claimed he did not realise the previous owner had moved. Dougherty was meant to face court on theft and burglary charges in May 2011, but instead was arrested shortly before his case was called and sentencing did not go ahead. He was ordered by the court to undergo a drug and alcohol assessment. On 7 July 2011 Dougherty was sentenced to 300 hours of community work and nine months of supervision.

Dougherty died on 20 April 2017, not long after his 50th birthday, after a long illness.

See also 
 List of miscarriage of justice cases in New Zealand

References 

 

1967 births
2017 deaths
New Zealand prisoners and detainees
Overturned convictions in New Zealand
People wrongfully convicted of rape